This page lists all described species of the spider family Mysmenidae accepted by the World Spider Catalog :

B

Brasilionata

Brasilionata Wunderlich, 1995
 B. arborense Wunderlich, 1995 (type) — Brazil

C

Chanea

Chanea Miller, Griswold & Yin, 2009
 C. suukyii Miller, Griswold & Yin, 2009 (type) — China
 C. voluta Lin & Li, 2016 — China

D

† Dominicanopsis

† Dominicanopsis Wunderlich, 2004
 † D. grimaldii Wunderlich, 2004

E

† Eomysmenopsis

† Eomysmenopsis Wunderlich, 2004
 † E. spinipes Wunderlich, 2004

G

Gaoligonga

Gaoligonga Miller, Griswold & Yin, 2009
 G. changya Miller, Griswold & Yin, 2009 (type) — China
 G. taeniata Lin & Li, 2014 — Vietnam
 G. zhusun Miller, Griswold & Yin, 2009 — China

I

Isela

Isela Griswold, 1985
 I. inquilina (Baert & Murphy, 1987) — Kenya
 I. okuncana Griswold, 1985 (type) — South Africa

M

Maymena

Maymena Gertsch, 1960
 M. ambita (Barrows, 1940) — USA
 M. calcarata (Simon, 1898) — St. Vincent
 M. cascada Gertsch, 1971 — Mexico
 M. chica Gertsch, 1960 — Mexico
 M. delicata Gertsch, 1971 — Mexico
 M. grisea Gertsch, 1971 — Mexico
 M. mayana (Chamberlin & Ivie, 1938) (type) — Mexico, Guatemala
 M. misteca Gertsch, 1960 — Mexico
 M. rica Platnick, 1993 — Costa Rica
 M. roca Baert, 1990 — Peru
 M. sbordonii Brignoli, 1974 — Mexico

Microdipoena

Microdipoena Banks, 1895
 M. comorensis (Baert, 1986) — Comoros
 M. elsae Saaristo, 1978 — Seychelles, Congo, Comoros
 M. gongi (Yin, Peng & Bao, 2004) — China
 M. guttata Banks, 1895 (type) — USA to Paraguay
 M. illectrix (Simon, 1895) — Philippines
 M. jobi (Kraus, 1967) — Europe, Caucasus, Iran, China, Korea, Japan
 M. menglunensis (Lin & Li, 2008) — China
 M. mihindi (Baert, 1989) — Rwanda
 M. nyungwe Baert, 1989 — Rwanda, Tanzania, Madagascar
 M. ogatai (Ono, 2007) — Japan
 M. papuana (Baert, 1984) — New Guinea
 M. pseudojobi (Lin & Li, 2008) — China, Japan
 M. saltuensis (Simon, 1895) — Sri Lanka
 M. samoensis (Marples, 1955) — Samoa, Hawaii
 M. vanstallei Baert, 1985 — Cameroon
 M. yinae (Lin & Li, 2013) — China

Mosu

Mosu Miller, Griswold & Yin, 2009
 M. dayan Lin & Li, 2013 — China
 M. huogou Miller, Griswold & Yin, 2009 — China
 M. nujiang Miller, Griswold & Yin, 2009 (type) — China
 M. tanjia Lin & Li, 2013 — China

Mysmena

Mysmena Simon, 1894
 M. acuminata (Marples, 1955) — Samoa
 M. arcilonga Lin & Li, 2008 — China
 M. awari (Baert, 1984) — New Guinea
 M. baoxingensis Lin & Li, 2013 — China
 M. biangulata (Lin & Li, 2008) — China
 M. bizi Miller, Griswold & Yin, 2009 — China
 M. calypso Gertsch, 1960 — Trinidad
 M. caribbaea (Gertsch, 1960) — Jamaica, Trinidad
 M. changouzi Miller, Griswold & Yin, 2009 — China
 M. colima (Gertsch, 1960) — Mexico
 M. conica (Simon, 1895) — Algeria
 M. cornigera (Lin & Li, 2008) — China
 M. dumoga (Baert, 1988) — Indonesia (Sulawesi)
 M. furca Lin & Li, 2008 — China
 M. gibbosa Snazell, 1986 — Spain
 M. goudao Miller, Griswold & Yin, 2009 — China
 M. guianensis Levi, 1956 — Guyana
 M. haban Miller, Griswold & Yin, 2009 — China
 M. incredula (Gertsch & Davis, 1936) — USA, Mexico, Bahama Is., Cuba, Panama
 M. isolata Forster, 1977 — St. Helena
 M. jinlong Miller, Griswold & Yin, 2009 — China
 M. leichhardti Lopardo & Michalik, 2013 — Australia (Queensland)
 M. leucoplagiata (Simon, 1880) (type) — Southern Europe to Azerbaijan, Israel
 M. lulanga Lin & Li, 2016 — China
 M. maculosa Lin & Li, 2014 — Vietnam
 M. marijkeae (Baert, 1982) — New Guinea
 M. marplesi (Brignoli, 1980) — New Caledonia
 M. mooatae (Baert, 1988) — Indonesia (Sulawesi)
 M. nubiai (Baert, 1984) — New Guinea
 M. phyllicola (Marples, 1955) — Samoa, Niue
 M. quebecana Lopardo & Dupérré, 2008 — Canada
 M. rostella Lin & Li, 2008 — China
 M. rotunda (Marples, 1955) — Samoa
 M. santacruzi (Baert & Maelfait, 1983) — Ecuador (Galapagos Is.)
 M. shibali Miller, Griswold & Yin, 2009 — China
 M. spirala Lin & Li, 2008 — China
 M. stathamae (Gertsch, 1960) — Mexico, Panama, Jamaica
 M. taiwanica Ono, 2007 — Taiwan
 M. tamdaoensis (Lin & Li, 2014) — Vietnam
 M. tarautensis (Baert, 1988) — Indonesia (Sulawesi)
 M. tasmaniae Hickman, 1979 — Australia (Tasmania)
 M. tembei (Baert, 1984) — Paraguay
 M. vangoethemi (Baert, 1982) — New Guinea
 M. vitiensis Forster, 1959 — Fiji
 M. wawuensis Lin & Li, 2013 — China
 M. woodwardi Forster, 1959 — New Guinea
 M. zhengi Lin & Li, 2008 — China
 † M. copalis Wunderlich, 2011 
 † M. curvata Wunderlich, 2011 
 † M. dominicana Wunderlich, 1998 
 † M. fossilis Petrunkevitch, 1971 
 † M. groehni Wunderlich, 2004 
 † M. grotae Wunderlich, 2004

Mysmeniola

Mysmeniola Thaler, 1995
 M. spinifera Thaler, 1995 (type) — Venezuela

Mysmenopsis

Mysmenopsis Simon, 1898
 M. alvaroi Dupérré & Tapia, 2020 — Ecuador
 M. amazonica Dupérré & Tapia, 2020 — Ecuador
 M. angamarca Dupérré & Tapia, 2020 — Ecuador
 M. archeri Platnick & Shadab, 1978 — Brazil
 M. atahualpa Baert, 1990 — Peru, Ecuador
 M. awa Dupérré & Tapia, 2020 — Ecuador
 M. baerti Dupérré & Tapia, 2020 — Ecuador
 M. bartolozzii Dupérré & Tapia, 2020 — Ecuador
 M. beebei (Gertsch, 1960) — Trinidad
 M. capac Baert, 1990 — Peru
 M. chiquita Dupérré & Tapia, 2015 — Ecuador
 M. choco Dupérré & Tapia, 2020 — Ecuador
 M. cidrelicola (Simon, 1895) — Venezuela
 M. cienaga Müller, 1987 — Colombia, Peru
 M. corazon Dupérré & Tapia, 2020 — Ecuador
 M. cube Dupérré & Tapia, 2020 — Ecuador
 M. cymbia (Levi, 1956) — USA
 M. dipluramigo Platnick & Shadab, 1978 — Panama, Colombia
 M. femoralis Simon, 1898 (type) — St. Vincent
 M. fernandoi Dupérré & Tapia, 2015 — Ecuador
 M. funebris Simon, 1898 — St. Vincent
 M. furtiva Coyle & Meigs, 1989 — Jamaica
 M. gamboa Platnick & Shadab, 1978 — Panama
 M. guanza Dupérré & Tapia, 2020 — Ecuador
 M. guayaca Dupérré & Tapia, 2020 — Ecuador
 M. huascar Baert, 1990 — Peru
 M. hunachi Dupérré & Tapia, 2020 — Ecuador
 M. ischnamigo Platnick & Shadab, 1978 — Panama, Trinidad, Peru
 M. ixlitla (Levi, 1956) — Mexico
 M. junin Dupérré & Tapia, 2020 — Ecuador
 M. kochalkai Platnick & Shadab, 1978 — Colombia
 M. lasrocas Dupérré & Tapia, 2020 — Ecuador
 M. lloa Dupérré & Tapia, 2020 — Ecuador
 M. mexcala Gertsch, 1960 — Mexico
 M. monticola Coyle & Meigs, 1989 — Jamaica
 M. onorei Dupérré & Tapia, 2015 — Ecuador
 M. otokiki Dupérré & Tapia, 2020 — Ecuador
 M. otonga Dupérré & Tapia, 2015 — Ecuador
 M. pachacutec Baert, 1990 — Peru
 M. palpalis (Kraus, 1955) — Mexico, Guatemala, Honduras
 M. penai Platnick & Shadab, 1978 — Ecuador, Colombia
 M. pululahua Dupérré & Tapia, 2020 — Ecuador
 M. salazarae Dupérré & Tapia, 2020 — Ecuador
 M. schlingeri Platnick & Shadab, 1978 — Peru
 M. shushufindi Dupérré & Tapia, 2020 — Ecuador
 M. tengellacompa Platnick, 1993 — Costa Rica
 M. tepuy Dupérré & Tapia, 2020 — Ecuador
 M. tibialis (Bryant, 1940) — Cuba
 M. tungurahua Dupérré & Tapia, 2020 — Ecuador
 M. viracocha Baert, 1990 — Peru
 M. wygodzinskyi Platnick & Shadab, 1978 — Peru
 M. yupanqui Baert, 1990 — Peru
 † M. lissycoleyae Penney, 2000

P

† Palaeomysmena

† Palaeomysmena Wunderlich, 2004
 † P. hoffeinsorum Wunderlich, 2004

Phricotelus

Phricotelus Simon, 1895
 P. stelliger Simon, 1895 (type) — Sri Lanka

S

Simaoa

Simaoa Miller, Griswold & Yin, 2009
 S. bianjing Miller, Griswold & Yin, 2009 — China
 S. kavanaugh Miller, Griswold & Yin, 2009 — China
 S. maku Miller, Griswold & Yin, 2009 — China
 S. yaojia Miller, Griswold & Yin, 2009 (type) — China

T

Trogloneta

Trogloneta Simon, 1922
 T. canariensis Wunderlich, 1987 — Canary Is.
 T. cantareira Brescovit & Lopardo, 2008 — Brazil
 T. cariacica Brescovit & Lopardo, 2008 — Brazil
 T. granulum Simon, 1922 (type) — Europe
 T. madeirensis Wunderlich, 1987 — Madeira
 T. mourai Brescovit & Lopardo, 2008 — Brazil
 T. nojimai (Ono, 2010) — Japan
 T. paradoxa Gertsch, 1960 — USA
 T. speciosum Lin & Li, 2008 — China
 T. uncata Lin & Li, 2013 — China
 T. yuensis Lin & Li, 2013 — China
 T. yunnanense (Song & Zhu, 1994) — China

Y

Yamaneta

Yamaneta Miller & Lin, 2019
 Y. kehen (Miller, Griswold & Yin, 2009) — China
 Y. paquini (Miller, Griswold & Yin, 2009) (type) — China

References

Mysmenidae